Dehsar or Deh Sar may refer to:
 Deh Sar, Astaneh-ye Ashrafiyeh
 Dehsar, Ahandan, Lahijan County
 Deh Sar, Baz Kia Gurab, Lahijan County
 Dehsar, Rasht